Sex and the Slayer: A Gender Studies Primer for the "Buffy" Fan is a 2005 academic publication relating to the fictional Buffyverse established by TV series, Buffy and Angel.

Book description

Written for undergraduates, Sex and the Slayer provides an introduction to feminism within mass media, specifically within the series Buffy.

The book looks at how the show approaches gender. Jowett takes a feminist cultural studies approach,  exploring the ways in which the series represents femininity, masculinity, and gendered relations, (this includes sexuality and sexual orientation).  Jowett argues that Buffy presents a mixture of "subversive" and "conservative" portrayal of gender roles.

Contents

External links
Phil-books.com - Review of this book
Slayage.tv - Review of this book

Books about the Buffyverse
Gender studies literature
2005 non-fiction books
Feminist books
Gender studies books